Established in 2005, Polymer Factory concentrates on developing well defined dendrimers and dendron based on 2,2-bis(methylol)propionic acid, where the company has the exclusive right to the production, marketing, and sales of such materials. The company also provides tailor-made hyperbranched polymers. Polymer Factory's research lab is located in Stockholm, Sweden.

The company supports research and development projects in a broad array of applications, ranging from Nanotechnology, Medicine, Photonic Application, Catalysis, Click chemistry, MALDI-TOF Calibrants, Thiol-ene Click and semiconductor materials.

Polymer Factory was founded in 2005.

References

External links
 United States Patent

See also
 Polymer
 Dendrimer

Companies based in Stockholm
Manufacturing companies established in 2005
Swedish companies established in 2005